Kiur (also Romanized as Kīūr) is a village in Lavasan-e Kuchak Rural District, Lavasanat District, Shemiranat County, Tehran Province, Iran. At the 2006 census, its population was 13, in 5 families.

References 

Populated places in Shemiranat County